"Streamline" is a song composed by Spanish makina group Newton. It was released in 1994 as a single in Spain. In 1996, it was released in France, reaching number 30 on their national chart.

In 2006, the song was featured in a Pepsi commercial featuring Jimmy Fallon, leading to some fame in the United States. The original length of the song was 5:05, but was shortened to fit the 30-second commercial. SPG Music re-released the song on July 10, 2006.

Track listing
"Streamline (Lips version)" – 5:05
"Streamline (Lipspace)" – 4:37
"Streamline (Voice & Pianopella)" – 5:05

Charts

Notes

External links
Newton - Streamline - Discogs reference

Electronic songs
1994 songs